The Republic of Sri Lanka Armed Services Medal was awarded to members of the regular and volunteer forces of the Military of Sri Lanka  who were in service on 22 May 1972, subject to recommendation by the commanders of the respective service commanders. Members of the then Ceylon Cadet Corps were ineligible. The award commemorated service at the time the country adopted a republican constitution, ceasing to be a Commonwealth realm.

External links
Sri Lanka Army
Sri Lanka Navy
Sri Lanka Air Force
Ministry of Defence : Sri Lanka

References
Army, Sri Lanka. (1st Edition - October 1999). "50 YEARS ON" - 1949-1999, Sri Lanka Army. 

Military awards and decorations of Sri Lanka
Awards established in 1981